Robia legula is a species of fanfin found in the western central Pacific Ocean where it is found at depths of .  This species is the only known member of its genus.

References
 

Caulophrynidae
Taxa named by Theodore Wells Pietsch III
Fish described in 1979